Scotinotylus alpinus is a species of sheet weaver found in Canada, Greenland, Mongolia, Russia and the United States. It was described by Banks in 1896.

References

Linyphiidae
Spiders described in 1896
Spiders of North America
Spiders of Asia
Spiders of Russia